The 2017 SWAC women's basketball tournament did take place March 7–11, 2017. Tournament first round games were held on campus sites at the higher seed on March 7. The remaining rounds and the semifinals and championship at Toyota Center in Houston, Texas. Texas Southern won their first SWAC Women's Tournament and will receive the Southwestern Athletic Conference's automatic bid to the 2017 NCAA Women's Division I Basketball Championship.

Seeds

Bracket

See also
 2017 SWAC men's basketball tournament

External links
 2017 SWAC Women's Basketball Championship

References

SWAC women's basketball tournament
2016–17 Southwestern Athletic Conference women's basketball season